Strawberry Spit (also Sanctuary Island) is a small artificial island in the San Francisco Bay's Richardson's Bay embayment of Strawberry Lagoon. It is still referred to as Strawberry Spit, although it no longer is technically a spit.

Historically the spit was a haul out area for harbor seals.  A channel was built separating Aramburu Island from the mainland to isolate and therefore protect the seals from human disturbances.

The landscape north and landward of Strawberry Spit is dominated by Ring Mountain, whose slopes are strewn with a multitude of boulders that include minerals such as mica, amphibolite and eclogite.

See also
 Strawberry Lagoon
 Tiburon Peninsula (U.S.)

References

Islands of San Francisco Bay
Islands of Northern California
Islands of Marin County, California
Mill Valley, California